Edward Hyde (baptised 1 April 1645; died 10 January 1665) briefly served as a Member of Parliament in the House of Commons of England.

Biography
Hyde was the third son of Edward Hyde, 1st Earl of Clarendon. He was educated at Christ Church, Oxford and the Middle Temple. In 1664, age nineteen, he was elected to Parliament for Salisbury, on the nomination of his father, the High Steward of the city. He died the following year.

References

1645 births
1665 deaths
Younger sons of earls
Alumni of Christ Church, Oxford
Members of the Middle Temple
English MPs 1661–1679